= Kushumha =

Coordinates: 24°25′N 84°38′E

Kushumha is a village in Uttar Pradesh, India.
